Jay Catherwood Hormel (September 11, 1892 – August 30, 1954) was the son of George A. Hormel, founder of Hormel Foods, and was head of the company from 1929 to 1954.

Early life
Hormel was born in Austin, Minnesota, in 1892.

Career 
In 1914, Hormel left college to work for the Hormel company. He continued to work there with only a brief interruption to serve in the military during World War I. In 1929, he was named president of Hormel.

Personal life 
Hormel married Germaine Dubois in 1922. Hormel had three sons: George Albert "Geordie" Hormel, Thomas Dubois Hormel, and James Catherwood Hormel.

Death 
Hormel died on August 30, 1954 in Austin, Minnesota. H.H. Corey was named chairman of the board of Hormel a few months later.

See also
Hormel Historic Home
Jay C. Hormel Nature Center

References
Jay Hormel
Hormel Historic Home Childhood home of Jay C. Hormel in Austin, Minnesota

1892 births
1954 deaths
People from Austin, Minnesota
Businesspeople in the meat packing industry
Hormel Foods people
American food company founders